Soft is an album by Dan Bodan released by DFA Records on 27 October 2014.

Track listing
All tracks by Dan Bodan except "For Heaven's Sake (Let's Fall in Love)" by Bodan, Elise Bretton, Sherman Edwards
	
"A Soft Opening" – 3:41	
"Anonymous" – 4:32		
"Romeo" – 4:30		
"Soft as Rain" – 3:52		
"For Heaven's Sake (Let's Fall in Love)" – 4:30		
"Reload" – 3:52		
"Jaws of Life" – 4:09		
"Rusty" – 4:12		
"Catching Fire" – 4:23		
"Goodtime Summer" – 2:58

References

2014 albums
DFA Records albums